= Chancetown, Virginia =

Unincorporated community in Virginia, United States

Coordinates: 37°37′56″N 75°42′02″W

Chancetown is an unincorporated community in Accomack County, Virginia, United States.
